BNV may refer to:

 Bloc Nacionalista Valencià, (Valencian Nationalist Bloc)
 Banavie railway station (National Rail station code BNV)
 Bicycle Network (formerly Bicycle Network Victoria).
 Bund Neues Vaterland (New Fatherland League, which later became the German League for Human Rights)
 Buona Vista MRT station (MRT station abbreviation BNV)